Labinot Ibrahimi (born 25 June 1986) is an Kosovan professional footballer who plays as a centre-back for First Football League of Kosovo club Feronikeli.

Personal life
On 5 November 2015, Ibrahimi became a father for the first time when his wife Donjeta gave birth to the couple's first daughter, named Jara.

References

1986 births
Living people
Sportspeople from Pristina
Association football defenders
Kosovan footballers
FC Prishtina players
FK Partizani Tirana players
Football Superleague of Kosovo players
Kategoria Superiore players
Kosovan expatriate footballers
Expatriate footballers in Albania
Kosovan expatriate sportspeople in Albania